In Christian hamartiology, occasions of sin are "external circumstances--whether of things or persons--which either because of their special nature or because of the frailty common to humanity or peculiar to some individual, incite or entice one to sin." This Christian theological concept is taught in the Roman Catholic, Lutheran, and Reformed traditions.

There are both proximate and remote occasions, where a proximate occasion is one in which men of like calibre for the most part fall into mortal sin, or one in which experience points to the same result from the special weakness of a particular person. The remote occasion lacks these elements. All theologians are agreed that there is no obligation to avoid the remote occasions of sin both because this would, practically speaking, be impossible and because they do not involve serious danger of sin.

The proximate occasion may be necessary, that is, such as a person cannot abandon or get rid of. Whether this impossibility be physical or moral does not matter for the determination of the principles hereinafter to be laid down.  A proximate occasion may be deemed necessary when it cannot be given up without grave scandal or loss of good name or without notable temporal or spiritual damage.

It may be voluntary, within the competency of one to remove. Moralists distinguish between a proximate occasion which is continuous and one which, whilst it is unquestionably proximate, yet confronts a person only at intervals. Someone who is in the presence of a proximate occasion at once voluntary and continuous is bound to remove it.

In confession, a refusal on the part of a penitent to do so would make it imperative for the confessor to deny absolution. It is not always necessary for the confessor to await the actual performance of this duty before giving absolution; he may be content with a sincere promise, which is the minimum to be required.

In root cause analysis the occasion of sin is identical to the idea of "set-up factors", i,e, situations in which it is likely for a person to perform dysfunctionally. In the nuclear industry community there is a set of ideas called "Event Free tools" that includes the idea of avoiding "Error Likely Situations", which are also called "Human Error Precursors."

In social counseling there is the acronymic advice, HALT (Hungry? Angry? Lonely? Tired?) relating to situations in which judgment is impaired.  These may be regarded as "occasions of sin."

Many Traditional Catholic congregations such as the Society of Saint Pius X (SSPX) oppose the presence of television in the household, teaching that it is an occasion of sin.

See also

Abstinence pledge
Confraternities of the Cord
Mortification of the flesh
Purity ring
Sacramentals
Temperance movement
Teetotalism

References

External links
Catholic Encyclopedia "Occasions of Sin"

Christian ethics
Christian hamartiology
Catholic moral theology